Angel L. Cruz is an American politicians who seved as a Democratic member of the Pennsylvania House of Representatives for the 180th district from 2001-2022. Cruz was a member of the Pennsylvania Legislative Black Caucus.

Ward leader
Cruz is the Ward Leader of the 7th Ward Democratic Executive Committee.

References

External links
Pennsylvania House of Representatives - Angel Cruz, Jr. official PA House website
Project Vote Smart - Representative Angel L. Cruz (PA) profile
Pennsylvania House Democratic Caucus - Rep. Angel Cruz official Party website

Democratic Party members of the Pennsylvania House of Representatives
Living people
African-American state legislators in Pennsylvania
Politicians from Philadelphia
21st-century American politicians
Year of birth missing (living people)
21st-century African-American politicians